Abdullah bin Md Zin (Jawi: عبدﷲ بن مد زين; born 2 August 1946) is a former Member of the Parliament of Malaysia for the Besut constituency in Terengganu serving for two terms from 2004 to 2013 and is a member of the United Malays National Organisation (UMNO), a member party of the Barisan Nasional coalition.

Early life and career 
Abdullah was born on 2 August 1946 in Alor Selinsing, Jerteh, Besut, Terengganu. He studied at the Islamic University of Madinah, graduating in 1972 with a bachelor's degree in Islamic Studies.

In 1973, he obtained a master's degree in Syariah from Al-Azhar University, Egypt, before receiving a Diploma in Education from Ain Shams University. He was awarded a Doctorate of Philosophy from Kent University, England, in 1986.

Abdullah became a lecturer in 1976, firstly at Kolej Islam Klang and then at the National University of Malaysia (UKM). In 1998, he was appointed as the dean of the Faculty of Islamic Studies and in 1999 he became a Professor. In 2000, he was appointed as Deputy Rector (Academic and Research) at Kolej Universiti Islam Malaysia (KUIM) in Nilai, Negeri Sembilan.

Politics 
Abdullah resigned from his lecturing position KUIM (but took early optional compulsory retirement from civil service at 58) in order to be the Barisan Nasional candidate for the federal parliamentary seat of Besut, Terengganu in the 2004 election. The seat had been held by the opposition Pan-Malaysian Islamic Party (PAS). Abdullah won the seat, defeating PAS's Nasharudin Mat Isa.

Later, Abdullah became a member of UMNO's Supreme Council and a Minister in the Department of Prime Minister Abdullah Ahmad Badawi. After the 2008 election, he was dropped from the cabinet and in the 2009 UMNO party elections, he failed to retain a position on the party's Supreme Council.

When Najib Tun Razak became Prime Minister in 2009, Abdullah became his Islamic religious affairs adviser. However, Abdullah did not recontest his parliamentary seat in the 2013 election, although he remained as Najib's religious adviser.

Election results

Honours

Honours of Malaysia
  :
  Commander of the Order of Loyalty to the Crown of Malaysia (PSM) – Tan Sri (2013)
  :
  Knight Commander of the Order of the Crown of Terengganu (DPMT) – Dato' (1996)
  :
  Knight Grand Commander of the Order of the Crown of Perlis (SPMP) – Dato' Seri (2010)

References

 

Living people
1946 births
People from Terengganu
Malaysian expatriates in Saudi Arabia
Members of the Dewan Rakyat
Islamic University of Madinah alumni
Alumni of the University of Kent
Al-Azhar University alumni
United Malays National Organisation politicians
Academic staff of the National University of Malaysia
Malaysian people of Malay descent
Malaysian Muslims
Government ministers of Malaysia
Malaysian expatriates in Egypt
Malaysian expatriates in the United Kingdom
Commanders of the Order of Loyalty to the Crown of Malaysia
Malaysian academics
Knights Commander of the Order of the Crown of Terengganu